The following is a list of notable deaths in June 2006.

Entries for each day are listed alphabetically by surname. A typical entry lists information in the following sequence:
 Name, age, country of citizenship at birth, subsequent country of citizenship (if applicable), reason for notability, cause of death (if known), and reference.

June 2006

1 

Radu Bălescu, 73, Romanian scientist.
Frederick S. Billig, 73, American aerospace engineer.
Shokichi Iyanaga, 100, Japanese mathematician.
Rocío Jurado, 61, Spanish singer and actress, pancreatic cancer.
Allan Prior, 84, British television scriptwriter (Z-Cars, Howards' Way, The Charmer), father of folk singer Maddy Prior.
Abdul Latif Sharif, 59, Egyptian chemist, suspect in the femicides in Ciudad Juárez, Mexico, officially of natural causes, rumored poisoning.
Jack Shelton, 82, Australian cricketer.
William D. Winn, 59, American professor of education at the University of Washington.

2 

Ronald Cass, 83, British film score composer.
Roy Farran, 85, British army officer.
Bernard Loomis, 82, American toymaker responsible for Strawberry Shortcake and Star Wars action figures, heart disease.
Leon Pownall, 63, Canadian actor, cancer.
Vince Welnick, 55, American keyboardist, member of The Grateful Dead, suicide.
Edward Yates, 87, American television director, director of American Bandstand (1952–1969).
Vyacheslav Klykov, 66, Russian sculptor and nationalist politician.

3 

Leo Clarke, 82, Australian Roman Catholic Bishop of Maitland–Newcastle, Australia, 1976-1995.
Brian Duke, 79, Ugandan-born tropical disease expert who helped to save millions from river blindness.
Johnny Grande, 76, American pianist, member of Bill Haley's backing band, The Comets. Complications arising from cancer.
George Kashdan, 78, American comic book writer and editor for DC Comics.
Doug Serrurier, 85, South African former Grand Prix racing driver and constructor.

4 

Alec Bregonzi, 76, British actor.
Bill Fleming, 92, American MLB pitcher for the Boston Red Sox and Chicago Cubs
Ron Jones, 41, American Major League Baseball player, brain hemorrhage.
Richard Kapp, 69, American conductor and founder of the Philharmonia Virtuosi.
John Kerr, 46, British footballer (Tranmere Rovers).
Fulvia Mammi, 79, Italian actress (Against the Law).
Anthony Marreco, 90, British barrister, junior Counsel at the Nuremberg Trials and founding member of Amnesty International.
Sir John Rowlands, 90, British air marshal and George Cross recipient.
William M. Steger, 85, United States district court judge and Republican candidate for Governor of Texas in 1960.

5 

Frederick Franck, 97, Dutch artist, author, and dentist.
Elizabeth Fretwell, 85, Australian opera singer best known for her performances with the Sadler's Wells company.
Eric Gregg, 55, American former Major League Baseball umpire, stroke.
Edward L. Moyers, 77, American railroad executive.
Robert Ross, 86, American leader of the Muscular Dystrophy Association for 44 years and persuaded Jerry Lewis to undertake a yearly telethon to raise money for muscular dystrophy, complications of broken hip.
Harley Rutledge, 80, American physicist and ufologist.
Huda Sultan, 80, Egyptian actress, cancer.

6 

Leslie Alcock, 81, British pioneer of Dark Age archaeology, led the team that excavated Cadbury Castle.
María Teresa López Boegeholz, 78, Chilean oceanographer.
Arnold Newman, 88, American photographer who pioneered "environmental portraiture".
Billy Preston, 59, American musician ("You Are So Beautiful", "Nothing from Nothing") known for his work with the Beatles, malignant hypertension leading to kidney failure.
Hilton Ruiz, 54, American jazz pianist, injuries from a fall.
Léon Weil, 109, French World War I veteran.
Jason Moss, 31, American attorney and author of the book "The Last Victim"

7 

Abu Musab al-Zarqawi, 39, Jordanian leader of Al-Qaeda in Iraq, US military strike.
Sheik Abd-Al-Rahman, spiritual adviser for Al-Qaeda in Iraq, US military strike.
Roy Brain, 79, Australian cricketer.
Terry McCann, 74, American wrestler, olympic gold medalist in freestyle wrestling and helped found USA Wrestling, and retired Executive Director of Toastmasters International, cancer.
Ingo Preminger, 95, Austrian-born American Hollywood talent agent and producer (M*A*S*H), brother of Otto Preminger.
Mickey Sims, 51, American football defensive tackle, former player with the Cleveland Browns, heart attack.
Louis B. Sohn, 92, Ukrainian-born scholar of international law, helped draft the UN Charter.
John Tenta (aka "Earthquake"), 42, Canadian professional wrestler for the World Wrestling Federation, bladder cancer.

8 

Jake Copass, 86, American cowboy poet, leukemia.
Robert Donner, 75, American character actor probably best known for playing Exidor on Mork & Mindy, aneurysm.
Jack Jackson (nom de plume Jaxon), 65, American comic book artist and co-founder of Rip Off Press.
Mykola Kolessa, 102, Ukrainian composer and conductor.
Abouna Matta El Meskeen, 87, Egyptian Coptic Orthodox monk, Spiritual Father of St. Macarius' Monastery in the Wilderness of Scetis, Egypt.
John Roberts, 72, Australian businessman, founder of Australian construction company Multiplex, Complications of diabetes.
Jamal Abu Samhadana, Palestinian leader of PA / Hamas forces in Gaza Strip and PRC. Killed by Israeli air strike.
Talcott Seelye, 84, United States Foreign Service Officer and ambassador to Tunisia and Syria.
Sir Peter Smithers, 92, British politician, MP for Winchester and Secretary General of the Council of Europe.

9 

Kinga Choszcz aka "Freespirit", Polish author (Led By Destiny: Hitchhiking Around the World), cerebral malaria.
Drafi Deutscher, 60, German singer.
Michael Forrestall, 73, Canadian senator, died following hospitalization for breathing problems.
Patricia Janus, 74, American poet, heart attack brought on by liver cancer.
Enzo Siciliano, 72, Italian writer, diabetes mellitus.
Vern Williams, 76, American bluegrass mandolin player and singer.

10 

Qadi Abdul Karim Abdullah Al-Arashi, 72, Yemeni politician, former President of North Yemen.
Hubertus Czernin, 50, Austrian journalist who helped return paintings looted by the Nazis, mastocytosis.
Moe Drabowsky, 70, Polish-born American Major League Baseball player, multiple myeloma.
German Goldenshteyn, 71, Bessarabian-born clarinetist and klezmer musician.
Wulff-Dieter Heintz, 76, German astronomer at Swarthmore College.
Kenneth Jack, 81, Australian artist.
Charles Johnson, 96, American Negro league baseball player for the Chicago American Giants, complications of prostate cancer.
Peter Douglas Kennedy, 83, British folklorist.
Philip Merrill, 72, American publisher and diplomat, suicide.
Ruddy Thomas, 54, Jamaican singer, heart attack.

11 

Michael Bartosh, 28, American Mac OS X Server expert, injuries from a fall.
Ernest Arthur Bell, 79, British biochemist, Director of the Royal Botanic Gardens, Kew.
James Cameron, 92, American civil rights activist, founder of America's Black Holocaust Museum, lymphoma.
Neroli Fairhall, 61, New Zealand paraplegic archer and Olympic competitor.
Rolande Falcinelli, 86, French organist and composer.
Tim Hildebrandt, 67, American artist, complications of diabetes.
Hugh Latimer, 93, English actor and toy maker.
Mike Quarry, 55, American light heavyweight boxer, who challenged Bob Foster for the title, pugilistic dementia.
Bruce Shand, 89, British Army officer, father of Camilla, The Duchess of Cornwall, and father-in-law of Charles, Prince of Wales, cancer.

12 

Anna Lee Aldred, 85, American jockey and first woman in US to receive a jockey's licence, member of the National Cowgirl Hall of Fame. 
Andrew William "Nicky" Barr, 90, Australian rugby union player and World War II fighter pilot 
Chakufwa Chihana, 67, Malawian politician, opposition figure who ran unsuccessfully for President losing to Bakili Muluzi, brain tumour.
György Ligeti, 83, Hungarian composer.
José Leite Lopes, 87, Brazilian physicist.
Kenneth Thomson, 2nd Baron Thomson of Fleet, 82, Canadian billionaire, media mogul and art collector. Possible heart attack.

13 

Freddie Gorman, 67, US songwriter.
Charles Haughey, 80, Irish politician, Taoiseach (1979–1981, 1982, 1987–1992), prostate cancer.
Hiroyuki Iwaki, 73, Japanese conductor, congestive heart failure.
Luis Jiménez, 65, American sculptor, crushed by a statue.
Burke Riley, 92, American lawyer and politician, Alzheimer's disease.
Dennis Shepherd, 79, South African Olympic boxer.

14 

Monty Berman, 94, British B-movie producer.
Surinder Kaur, 77, Indian Punjabi folk and classical singer known as the "nightingale of Punjab".
Edward Craig Morris, 66, American archaeologist.
Jean Roba, 75, Belgian comics writer
James Davis Speed, 91, American politician.

15 

Betty Curtis, 70, Italian singer, winner of Sanremo Music Festival in 1961 with Luciano Tajoli.
Raymond Devos, 83, French humorist.
Ján Langoš, 59, Slovak politician, head of the National Memory Institute of Slovakia.
Carlos Tovar, 92, Peruvian football player.

16 

Roland Boyes, 69, British Labour politician and photographer, Alzheimer's disease.
Barbara Epstein, 76, American literary editor, co-founder of the New York Review of Books, lung cancer.
Arthur Malvin, 83, American Emmy award-winning composer and lyricist, after a long illness.
Scott Manning, 48, Canadian athlete, builder and pilot of the world's smallest jet, crash landing.
Daphne Osborne, 76, British botanist.
Igor Śmiałowski, 88, Polish actor.

17 

Norma Becker, 76, American anti-war activist, former chair of the War Resisters League.
Cláudio Besserman Vianna (Bussunda), 43, Brazilian comedian, member of Casseta & Planeta, heart attack
Arthur Franz, 86, American character actor (Sands of Iwo Jima, Invaders from Mars), emphysema and heart disease.
Mikhail Lapshin, 71, Russian politician, leader of the Agrarian Party and former president of the Altai Republic (2002–2006), cause unknown.
Charles Older, 88, American Los Angeles Superior Court judge who presided over the Charles Manson trial, complications of a fall.
Abdul-Khalim Saydullayev, 38 or 39, Chechen separatist rebel leader.
Hiroaki Shukuzawa, 55, Japanese rugby union coach, heart attack.
Julian Slade, 76, English composer and lyricist of Salad Days, cancer.
Bob Weaver, 77, American TV Florida-based weatherman known as "Weaver the Weatherman" on WTVJ, cancer.

18 

Luke Belton, 87, Irish politician.
Hubert Cornfield, 77, Turkish film director in Hollywood (The Night of the Following Day, Les Grandes Moyens etc.).
Nathaniel Neiman Craley, Jr., 78, American politician, former Democratic member of the United States House of Representatives (1965–67) from Pennsylvania.
Jesus Fuertes, 68, Spanish painter and protégé of Pablo Picasso, heart attack.
Chris and Cru Kahui, 3-months, New Zealand child homicide victims.
Gică Petrescu, 91, Romanian singer.
Sir David Poole, 68, British judge.
Donald Reilly, 72, American cartoonist (The New Yorker), cancer. 
René Renou, 54, French vintner, president of INAO.
Netta Rheinberg, 94, English cricketer.
Vincent Sherman, 99, American film director (Mr. Skeffington, The Young Philadelphians), natural causes.
Richard Stahl, 74, American comedy actor, Parkinson's disease.
Madeleine St John, 64, Australian novelist who wrote a book shortlisted for the Booker Prize in 1997, emphysema.

19 

Hugh Baird, 76, Scottish footballer for Leeds United, Aberdeen, Airdrieonians and Scotland.
Duane Roland, 53, American guitarist and a founder of rock band Molly Hatchet.
Howard Shanet, 87, US conductor and composer.
Melvin Watson, 98, American Baptist minister who trained Martin Luther King Jr. and other civil rights leaders, complications from surgery.
Arthur Yap, 64, Singaporean poet, artist, and lecturer, English Department, University of Singapore, throat cancer.

20 

Maurice Bevan, 85, British bass-baritone.
Bill Daniel, 90, American politician, former Governor of Guam.
Evelyn Dubrow, 95, US women and labor advocate awarded the Presidential Medal of Freedom in 1999.
Billy Johnson, 87, American professional baseball player, former New York Yankee and All-Star third baseman, cause not given.
E. Pierce Marshall, 67, American businessman, son of J. Howard Marshall and Anna Nicole Smith's stepson and plaintiff in their inheritance feud, aggressive infection.
William Shurcliff, 97, American physicist, who helped develop the atomic bomb.
Claydes Charles Smith, 57, American musician, co-founder and lead guitarist of Kool and the Gang.

21 

Theo Bell, 52, American National Football League header with the Pittsburgh Steelers and the Tampa Bay Buccaneers, kidney disease and scleroderma.
Vern Leroy Bullough, 77, American medical historian, known for his history of nursing, cancer.
Denis Faul, 73, Irish Roman Catholic priest, former chaplain at the Maze Prison, outspoken critic of The Troubles and a key figure in attempts to end the 1981 Irish Hunger Strike in Northern Ireland, cancer.
Jacques Lanzmann, 79, French author, editor and songwriter.
Khamis al-Obeidi, 39, Iraqi defense lawyer for Saddam Hussein, kidnapped and shot.
David Walton, 43, British economist, member of the Bank of England's Monetary Policy Committee
Jonathan Wordsworth, 73, English academic, scholar of Romanticism and chair of the Wordsworth Trust.

22 

Heinz Ansbacher, 101, German-born psychologist and expert in the work of Alfred Adler.
Back Alley John, 51, Canadian musician.
Gilbert Monckton, 2nd Viscount Monckton of Brenchley, 90, British army general.
Moose, 15, American canine star of U.S. sit-com Frasier, played the character Eddie, "Skip" on film "My Dog Skip".
Chanel Petro Nixon, 16, American student, murder victim in Brooklyn, New York.
Sir Peter Russell, 92, British historian.
Sir Michael Weir, 81, British diplomat, Ambassador to Egypt (1979–1985).

23 

Martin Adler, 47, Swedish journalist. Shot by unknown assailant in Mogadishu, Somalia.
Harriet, 176, Galápagos tortoise believed to be the third oldest animal in the world and allegedly owned by Charles Darwin, heart failure.
Grady Johnson, 66, American WWF wrestler, known as "Crazy" Luke Graham; heart failure.
Budhi Kunderan, 66, Indian cricketer, wicketkeeper/batsman, lung cancer.
Basil O'Ferrall, 81, Irish Anglican priest, Dean of Jersey (1985–1993).
Tom Pelly, 70, Australian rules footballer (North Melbourne).
Aaron Spelling, 83, American television producer (Charlie's Angels, Starsky and Hutch, Beverly Hills, 90210), complications of stroke.

24 

Denice Denton, 46, American professor, chancellor of the University of California at Santa Cruz, suicide.
Tichaona Jokonya, 67, Zimbabwean politician, Information & Publicity Minister, cardiac arrest.
Patsy Ramsey, 49, American beauty pageant winner, mother of JonBenét Ramsey, ovarian cancer.
Lyle Stuart, 83, American journalist and publisher.
Gerald Tomlinson, 73, American mystery and baseball writer.
Ric Weiland, 53, American Microsoft pioneer, developed BASIC, COBOL and Microsoft Works, suicide.

25 

Elkan Allan, 83, British television producer, created Ready Steady Go! and developed the first television listings for the UK in the Sunday Times.
Eliyahu Asheri, 18, Israeli civilian kidnapped and murdered by militants in the West Bank city of Ramallah.
Charles Barrow, 84, American former justice of the Texas Supreme Court.
Richard DeVore, 73, American ceramicist, lung cancer.
Kenneth Griffith, 84, Welsh actor and documentary maker, Parkinson's disease.
Akbar Hossain, 65, Bangladeshi Minister for Shipping and hero of 1971 Bangladesh Liberation War, heart attack.
Irving Kaplansky, 89, American mathematician at the University of Chicago.
Dibya Khaling, 56, Nepali musician, composer and lyricist, responsible for 1,000 songs, cardiac arrest.
Arif Mardin, 74, Turkish-American Grammy Award winning music producer, pancreatic cancer.
Sophie Maslow, 95, American choreographer.
Gad Navon, 84, Moroccan-born Former Chief Israeli Military Rabbi, cancer.
Jaap Penraat, 88, Dutch architect and member of Dutch resistance in World War II.
Seema Aissen Weatherwax, 100, Ukrainian photographer.

26 

Bear JJ1 (Bruno the Bear), the first wild bear in Germany in 170 years, shot to death.
Paulino Díaz, 71, Mexican sports shooter.
Johnny Jenkins, 67, American blues guitarist who influenced Otis Redding and Jimi Hendrix, stroke.
Parami Kulatunga, Sri Lankan military officer, Deputy Chief of Staff of the Sri Lankan Army, bomb blast.
Frederick Mayer, 84, German educational philosopher, creativity expert, author of "History of Educational Thought".
Eric Rofes, 51, American author and AIDS educator, heart attack.
Stan Torgerson, 82, American radio announcer for Ole Miss football and basketball games.
Jeff Winkless, 65, American voice actor, brain tumor.

27 

Eileen Barton, 76, American singer, actress, ovarian cancer
Robert Carrier, 82, American celebrity chef.
J. Robert Elliott, 96, US Federal District Judge who overturned the conviction of Lt. William Calley.
Sir Gerard Mansfield, 84, British admiral.
Marta Mata, 80, Spanish politician and pedagogue.
Ángel Maturino Reséndiz, 45, Mexican convicted serial killer, execution by lethal injection.

28 

Jim Baen, 62, American science fiction editor and publisher.
Vikram Dharma, 44/45, Indian film stunt director.
Theodore Levitt, 81, German-born former editor of the Harvard Business Review and author of books on marketing, coined the term globalization.
June Lloyd, Baroness Lloyd of Highbury, 78, British paediatrician and life peer.
Mahmoud Mestiri, 77, Tunisian diplomat and politician, former foreign minister.
George Page, 71, American television host, creator and narrator of the PBS series Nature.
Peter Rawlinson, Baron Rawlinson of Ewell, 87, English barrister, politician and author.
Fernando Sanchez, 70, Belgian-born fashion designer.
George Unwin, 93, British pilot and RAF officer, Battle of Britain flying ace.
Lennie Weinrib, 71, American actor.

29 

Fabián Bielinsky, 47, Argentine film director, heart attack.
Joseph Edamaruku, 71, Indian journalist, heart attack.
Joyce Hatto, 77, English classical pianist, who plagiarized more than 100 albums, cancer.
Ed Hugus, 82, American racing driver.
Stanley Moskowitz, 68, American CIA liaison to Congress, heart attack.
Wallace Potts, 59, American film archivist for the Rudolf Nureyev Foundation, lymphoma.
Lloyd Richards, 87, Canadian-American theatre director, first black Broadway director, Tony Award winner, heart failure.
Pierre Rinfret, 82, Canadian-born economist and Republican candidate for Governor of New York in 1990.
Randy Walker, 52, American Northwestern University football coach, apparent heart attack
F. Mark Wyatt, 86, American CIA officer, who delivered bags of money to swing the 1948 Italy election.

30 

Robert Gernhardt, 68, German satirist.
Edward S. Hamilton, 89, American Army officer, highly decorated Army veteran during World War II, pneumonia.
Harold Olmo, 96, American grape breeder and geneticist.
Richard Streeton, 75, English sports journalist 
Ross Tompkins, 68, American The Tonight Show pianist.

References

2006-06
 06